Ayman Adais (born June 28, 1978), also Ayman Idais, is a retired  professional basketball player who last played for the Jordanian team Zain.

Adais competed with the Jordanian team in the FIBA Asia Championship when it was held in 2007 and 2009, where he averaged 10.9 points and therefore raised the Jordanian team's points to 4.3.  Due to this his team came third place (a national first) and qualified to compete in the 2010 FIBA World Championship (its first contest of this kind), where Adais was present.

References

1978 births
Living people
Basketball players at the 2006 Asian Games
Centers (basketball)
Jordanian men's basketball players
2010 FIBA World Championship players
Asian Games competitors for Jordan